The Bachelor of Architectural Studies is a bachelor's degree for studies in the field of architecture. 

It generally takes three to four years. A Bachelor of Architectural Studies may lead on to a Master of Architecture, or a Bachelor of Architecture. 

In some countries, this degree may allow people to be officially registered as an architect.

References 

Architectural education
Architectural Studies